Hassan Abshenasan was one of the commanders of the Ground Forces of Islamic Republic of Iran Army who was killed in the Iran–Iraq war.

Biography 
Hassan Abshenasan was born in a religious family on 1936 in Nazi Abad district of Tehran. He spent his primary school in Tehran and graduated from high school in 1957. Then he entered military university and three years later graduated with Second Lieutenant. Hassan passed primary and advanced of military in Shiraz province and spent special courses in AJA University of Command and Staff, Tehran. Also, he received commando training in Iran and parachute and ranger training in Scotland. Abshenasan was skilled in athletics, volleyball, basketball, table tennis, swimming, horse riding, and judo.

In Iran-Iraq war 
Hassan Abshenasan had different roles during Iran-Iraq war, including:
 Commander of Hamzeh Seyes ol-Shohada residence
 Commander of 23rd Special Forces Division
 Commander of residence of northwest of Iran
 Teacher of guerrilla warfare education
 Teacher of Sepah forces who were based in Sa'd-Abad
 Forming Komeil residence in Iraq
 Combining of forces of Islamic Republic of Iran Army and Sepah
 Designing Operation Qader and Implementation it

Death 
On 30 September 1985, he was killed in Sarsul Kelashin area in the north of Iraq. He was Commander of Airborne Special Forces at that time. People of Dasht-e Abbas called him lion of wilderness.

In popular culture

Book 

Old Guerilla book is biography of Hassan Abshenasan for young readers to know his life. The book was written by Mozhgan Hazratian Fumm and published by Soureh Sabz Publishing Institute. Author asserted that: "courage, persistence and religious confidence were Abshenasan's outstanding personal traits."

Film 

Documentary film about Hassan Abshenasan's life is producing by Masoud Imami. The film have several interview with his family and his friend during Iran-Iraq war. For showing different angles of his life especially for remaking the scene of fighting in Iran-Iraq war, use computerized simulation.

Lion of Wilderness 
The lion of wilderness was authored by Alireza Por Bozorg that is biography of Abshenasan.

The Secret Half-moon 
The secret Half-moon is Abshenasan's wife narration about Hassan that authored by Marjan Fouladvan.

Men of plain of light 
Men of plain of light is collection of memories of the commanders of Ground Forces of Islamic Republic of Iran Army that authored by Abolfazl Norani.

Brighter than blue 
Brighter than blue was authored by Farzam Shirzadi. This book is written in 11 chapters and 160 pages.

Expressway  
Abshenasan Expressway known as Expressway in northern Tehran. It is named after Hassan Abshenasan, former commander of the 23rd Commando Division who was killed during Iran–Iraq War.

References

External links 
Hassan Abshenasan photos

Iranian military personnel killed in the Iran–Iraq War
Islamic Republic of Iran Army colonels
1936 births
1985 deaths